Daniel Drew (1850 - 2 February 1914) was a Scottish international rugby union player who played for Glasgow Academicals in Glasgow.

Born in Dunoon in 1850, Drew played as a Forward.

Drew played in the first ever rugby union international match for Scotland against England in 27 March 1871 at Raeburn Place, Edinburgh.

Almost five years later Daniel received another Scotland call up to play against England. He played in the 6 March 1876 match at The Oval in London.

Drew's brother Thomas Auchterlonie Drew also played for Glasgow Academicals. Although Thomas never made the Scotland national team, he did play for Glasgow District. Thomas was involved in his own first, when he played for Glasgow District against Edinburgh District on 23 November 1872, the world's very first inter-provincial and inter-city rugby union match.

References

1850 births
1914 deaths
Glasgow Academicals rugby union players
Rugby union players from Dunoon
Scotland international rugby union players
Scottish rugby union players
Rugby union forwards